Bath Beach is a neighborhood in Brooklyn, New York City, United States. It is located at the southwestern edge of the borough on Gravesend Bay. The neighborhood borders Bensonhurst and New Utrecht to the northeast across 86th Street; Dyker Beach Park and Golf Course to the northwest across 14th Avenue; and Gravesend to the east across Stillwell Avenue.

History

Bath Beach held one of Brooklyn's earliest African-American settlements. Freed slaves were given a parcel of land to settle in the mid-nineteenth century. The church that was once located in the heart of that community, Mount Zion Baptist, has moved to Bedford-Stuyvesant.

The term "Bath Beach" once described the beach resort specifically as part of the community of Bath, New York. Bath and Bath Beach are now more or less synonymous. The population of Bath Beach received a boost at the end of 1863 when steam dummy railroad service connected the community to the City of Brooklyn horsecar system terminal at 25th Street and 5th Avenue in Sunset Park. Bath Beach, named for the English spa, Bath, Somerset, was developed as a recreational seaside retreat for affluent families. It was part of the original Brooklyn town of New Utrecht. Although Coney Island was nearby, Bath Beach also had its own amusement park.

Despite its name, the neighborhood no longer has an actual beach. The beach was paved over during the mid-twentieth century to create the Shore Parkway. On the northwestern half, a promenade was constructed to allow residents access to a sea wall. The southwestern half, filled in with land excavated from the construction of the Shore (Belt) Parkway in the early 1940s, extended Bensonhust Park, from Cropsey Avenue with ballfields and, later, the Ceasar's Bay shopping center.

Demographics
Bath Beach is primarily a working-class community of semi-attached houses and small apartment houses. Bath Beach is becoming a mixed ethnic community as more recent Chinese, Middle Eastern, and former Soviet immigrants mix with the more established Italian-American population. The neighborhood contains a variety of small mom-and-pop businesses intermixed with chain stores, most of which are located at the  Bay Shopping Center at the terminus of Bay Parkway, as well as on 86th  Street.

Based on data from the 2010 United States Census, the population of Bath Beach was 29,931, an increase of 1,359 (4.8%) from the 28,572 counted in 2000.

The racial makeup of the neighborhood was 54.8% (16,389) White, 0.9% (273) African American, 0.1% (21) Native American, 29.9% (8,953) Asian, 0.0% (10) Pacific Islander, 0.2% (67) from other races, and 1.1% (324) from two or more races. Hispanic or Latino of any race were 13.0% (3,894) of the population.

Bath Beach has had a long history of being predominantly populated by Italian Americans just like other surrounding areas like Bensonhurst, Dyker Heights, and Gravesend. However, since the beginning of the 21st century, large influx of Asian or American-Asian residents, mainly of Chinese heritage have been moving into these neighborhoods and in the 2020 census data according to NYC Dept. Of City Planning, each the white population and Asian population in Bath Beach were between 10,000 to 19,999 indicating that the neighborhood approximately are almost equally white and Asian populated, though a CNN article about the US racial populations shows in further detail that the white population is just slightly higher than the Asian population in Bath Beach. However, as of 2020, Dyker Heights and Bensonhurst showed the Asian populations surpassing the white populations for the first time in history.

Street grid

Streets of the neighborhood have a unique nomenclature. Four two-way thoroughfares traverse the neighborhood, running southeast/northwest, parallel to Shore Parkway: these are Cropsey Avenue, Bath Avenue, Benson Avenue, and 86th Street. Another, Harway Avenue, runs from Stillwell only as far as 24th Avenue. The one-way northeast/southwest cross-streets are numbered, with the word "Bay" attached (to distinguish them from other numbering systems elsewhere in the borough), from Bay 7th Street in the northwest through Bay 54th Street in the southeast. Every third "Bay" numbered street is replaced with a two-way numbered avenue, from 14th Avenue in the northwest to 28th Avenue in the southeast (except for what would be 22nd Avenue, which is called Bay Parkway). These avenues (as well as 86th Street) are part of the larger grid of avenues and streets encompassing other neighborhoods to the north and west, in the former Towns of Gravesend, New Utrecht, and Brooklyn. Belt Parkway runs on the shorefront north of Bay Parkway and is close to the shorefront south of Bay Parkway.

Parks
Parks in Bath Beach include Bath Playground, Calvert Vaux Park, Scarangella Playground, and Anthony Catanzaro Square.

Transportation
Stations along the line serving the community are 18th Avenue, 20th Avenue, Bay Parkway, 25th Avenue, and Bay 50th Street.

Library
The Brooklyn Public Library's Ulmer Park branch is located at 2602 Bath Avenue near 26th Avenue. It was founded as a subdivision of another library in 1951 before becoming a full-fledged circulation branch in 1956. The current building was opened in 1963 and was renovated in 2016.

In popular culture 
During the 1970s, Bath Beach's commercial strip along 86th Street was used for scenes in the 1971 feature film The French Connection, in the opening credits to the popular television series Welcome Back, Kotter, and most famously in the opening scene of the 1977 feature film Saturday Night Fever. Tony Manero, the lead character (played by John Travolta), walks along the sidewalk, admires shoes in a storefront window, buys two (stacked) slices of pizza through a pizzeria window-counter at Lenny's Pizza, and ends up at the hardware store where he works (based on a real hardware store on Fifth Avenue in nearby Bay Ridge). The strip was used again in 2016 for the filming of Red Hot Chili Peppers - Go Robot music video. The film John Wick: Chapter 3 – Parabellum features the main character on horseback along 86th Street.

References
 

Neighborhoods in Brooklyn
Little Italys in the United States
Populated coastal places in New York (state)
Italian-American culture in New York City
Russian-American culture in New York City
Chinese-American culture in New York City